Phylus is a genus of true bugs belonging to the family Miridae.

The species of this genus are found in Europe and Japan.

Species
BioLib includes:
subgenus Phylus Hahn, 1831 
 Phylus coryli (Linnaeus, 1758) - type species (syn. P. pallipes Hahn, 1758)
 Phylus limbatellus Poppius, 1912
 Phylus melanocephalus (Linnaeus, 1767)
 Phylus nigriscapus Kerzhner, 1988
subgenus Teratoscopus Fieber, 1861 

 Phylus breviceps Reuter, 1899
 Phylus coryloides Josifov & Kerzhner, 1972
 Phylus miyamotoi Yasunaga, 1999
 Phylus plagiatus (Herrich-Schäffer, 1835)

References

External links

Phylini
Hemiptera of Europe
Miridae genera